In general, a query is a form of questioning, in a line of inquiry.

Query may also refer to:

Computing and technology
 Query, a precise request for information retrieval made to a database or information system
 Query language, a computer language used to make queries into databases and information systems
 Query string, in the World Wide Web, is an optional part of a URL
 Web search query, a query entered by users into web search engines
 Command-query separation (CQS), a concept in object-oriented programming, especially in the Eiffel programming language
 jQuery, a lightweight JavaScript library that emphasizes interaction between JavaScript and HTML

People with the name
 Jeff Query (born 1967), an American football player
 Nate Query, a musician

Other uses
 Query (complexity), a mapping from structures of one vocabulary to structures of another vocabulary
 Query (Quaker), a question used for reflection and spiritual exercises among members of the Society of Friends
 The Queries, a set of 31 questions outlined by Isaac Newton beginning in 1704

See also
 Queue (disambiguation)